Kaniere is a small town in the Westland District of the West Coast region of New Zealand's South Island.  Hokitika lies to the north-west, and the Hokitika River flows past to the south-west.

The locality began about 1865 as one of the main alluvial gold fields of the West Coast gold rush. The Hokitika & Kanieri Tramway laid with wooden rails was established from Hokitika by 1868, with cars drawn by horses. A road followed by 1873.

Kaniere often seen written Kanieri, official spelling of the town is Kaniere 

Locality on the Hokitika River, 5 km southeast of Hokitika. Kaniere Survey District.

History/Origin/Meaning:

Reeds Dictionary of New Zealand Place Names gives the following explanation, "Kani is the act of sawing greenstone preparatory to making tools, weapons or ornaments, a long wearisome process. The name was formerly and incorrectly spelt Kanieri. The terminal ere or eri is inexplicable. There is just a possibility that it was originally oro, literally to grind or sharpen on a stone. It may be significant that, according to legend, Kanioro was the fabled guardian of greenstone". Instead of Kanieri. This decision confirms and supersedes the decision of 1930. (Gaz 1948, p939)[./Https://gazetteer.linz.govt.nz/place/2381

Demographics
The population of Kaniere was 300 in the 2018 census, unchanged from 2013. There were 159 males and 144 females. 92.9% of people identified as European/Pākehā, 16.1% as Māori and 1.8% as Asian. 20.0% were under 15 years old, 12.8% were 15–29, 54.0% were 30–64, and 14.0% were 65 or older.

The statistical area of Hokitika Rural, which at 154 square kilometres is much larger than Kaniere, had a population of 1,440 at the 2018 New Zealand census, an increase of 81 people (6.0%) since the 2013 census, and an increase of 153 people (11.9%) since the 2006 census. There were 570 households. There were 732 males and 705 females, giving a sex ratio of 1.04 males per female. The median age was 46.2 years (compared with 37.4 years nationally), with 276 people (19.2%) aged under 15 years, 183 (12.7%) aged 15 to 29, 738 (51.2%) aged 30 to 64, and 246 (17.1%) aged 65 or older.

Ethnicities were 93.3% European/Pākehā, 11.2% Māori, 0.4% Pacific peoples, 1.5% Asian, and 2.5% other ethnicities (totals add to more than 100% since people could identify with multiple ethnicities).

The proportion of people born overseas was 12.1%, compared with 27.1% nationally.

Although some people objected to giving their religion, 55.2% had no religion, 33.8% were Christian, 0.2% were Hindu, 0.2% were Buddhist and 1.7% had other religions.

Of those at least 15 years old, 177 (15.2%) people had a bachelor or higher degree, and 243 (20.9%) people had no formal qualifications. The median income was $34,100, compared with $31,800 nationally. The employment status of those at least 15 was that 624 (53.6%) people were employed full-time, 207 (17.8%) were part-time, and 24 (2.1%) were unemployed.

Education
Kaniere School is a coeducational contributing primary (years 1–6) school with a roll of  students as of

Notes

Westland District
Populated places in the West Coast, New Zealand